The FIS Ski Jumping Grand Prix is a summer circuit yearly arranged by International Ski Federation. This competition for men was first arranged in 1994 and for the first time for women in 2012. The competition is held on ski jumps with artificial surfaces. There are about 10 competitions per season, held in the months between July and October. Regular venues for the competition are Courchevel, Hakuba, Einsiedeln, Wisła, Hinterzarten and Klingenthal. First official mixed team event with four jumpers (two men and two women) was organized in 2012. The most successful participants are Adam Małysz and Thomas Morgenstern, each having won the Grand Prix three times.

A similar level of competition held in winter is the World Cup; the lower circuits include the Continental Cup, the FIS Cup, the FIS Race and the Alpen Cup.

Global map of all grand prix hosts 
All 25 locations around the globe which have been hosting grand prix events for men (25) and ladies (5) at least one time in the history of this competition. Râșnov is the next new upcoming host in 2018.

Men's standings

Overall

Poland Tour

Nations Cup

Four Nations Grand Prix

Ladies' standings

Overall

Nations Cup

Men's stats

Wins 
As of 24 July 2022

Podiums 
As of 23 August 2020

Ladies' stats

Wins 
As of 18 August 2019

Podiums 
As of 18 August 2019

Grand Prix
 
International Ski Federation competitions